Purmerend is a city and municipality in the west of the Netherlands, in the province of North Holland. The city is surrounded by polders, such as the Purmer, Beemster and the Wormer. The city became the trade center of the region but the population grew relatively slowly. Only after 1960 did the population start to grow from around 10,000 to around 80,000 by the 2010s. From the 1960s onwards, Purmerend has seen major expansion and continues to do so. This expansion has turned Purmerend into a commuter town; many inhabitants of Purmerend (14,200 in 2011) work, go to school or spend their leisure time in Amsterdam. Purmerend is part of the Randstad, one of the largest conurbations in Europe.

The municipality of Beemster merged into the municipality of Purmerend on 1 January 2022. The extended municipality has a population of about 92,000 inhabitants.

History

Early history

Purmerend was created out of the small fishing village Purmer, which was situated on the land between the Purmermeer (Purmer Lake), the Beemstermeer (Beemster Lake) and the Wormermeer (Wormer Lake) on the south bank of the river De Weere, which used to connect the former Purmermeer and Beemstermeer.

Purmerend was founded by a rich banker and landowner from Amsterdam, Willem Eggert. HRH Count William VI of Holland (Willem VI van Holland) gave him permission to build his own fortified castle, Slot Purmerstein, in 1410. The castle's construction was completed in 1413. This also led to the foundation of the town of Purmerend. The castle was demolished in 1741, after it had fallen into decline. 

In 1434 Purmerend was given city rights and on 21 April 1484 (some sources claim 14 April 1484) the city was given “marktrechten” (the right to organise two “jaarmarkten” annual markets and a “weekmarkt” weekly market) by Count Jan van Egmond. This meant merchants from outside of Purmerend could now offer their merchandise for sale on the market. Before 1484 only food products for its own population were allowed to be sold.

17th century
By 1500 Purmerend had grown considerably, as can be seen on maps dating from that period. They show that the town had a rectangular shape and was crossed by two roads: one leading north–south, the other east–west. The draining of the Beemster Lake in 1612 and the Purmer Lake in 1622 resulted in a great loss in fishing grounds to Purmerend. However, the new and fertile soil favoured agriculture and livestock breeding, making Purmerend prosperous again. Purmerend now became the centre of an agricultural region, the produce of which was sold on the markets of Purmerend.

19th century
From 1819 till 1824 the Noordhollandsch Kanaal was constructed. It was dug along existing waterways like the Oude Vaart, which connected Purmerend to the IJ opposite Amsterdam, and along canals that connected Purmerend to Alkmaar. On 20 July 1821 the large  (Purmerend Lock) was completed just west of the city center.

The Noordhollandsch Kanaal would unexpectedly bring great prosperity to Purmerend. In 1840 the company Brantjes en Comp., trading in wood was founded. The Firma Dirk Bakker also started to import wood. Meanwhile, Firma Pont from Edam diverted her imports over Purmerend via the  river. Ships from Norway, Sweden, Russia and America then started to make direct trips to Purmerend to bring wood. Sometimes 12 of these were present at the same time.

The increased commerce and shipping led to the creation of an industry that catered for ships. In turn Purmerend merchants started to equip whalers. In 1866 the establishment of a tow service with 7 tugboats by Gebroeders Goedkoop was one of the last highlights of this period. By about 1880 this boom period for Purmerend was ending, because the new North Sea Canal diverted traffic elsewhere.

20th century
During World War II Purmerend was occupied by German forces on 14 May 1940. After five years of occupation, the city was liberated by Canadian and other allied forces on Wednesday 9 May 1945.

21st century
Purmerend was named Kermisstad van Nederland (Funfair City of the Netherlands) in 2003. After the funfair, Purmerend is most famous for its cattle market, the so-called koemarkt (“cow market”), where cattle are sold and traded, mostly cows and sheep.  After the outbreak of many cattle diseases between 1995 and 2001 the cattle market was not allowed any more. It was reinstated on a smaller scale in January 2002.

After 400 years Purmerenders saw the last cattle auction at the original location in downtown Purmerend in 2008. The auction was moved to the "Baanstee Oost" industrial area, in the north side of Purmerend. This was decided for various reasons: freeing up downtown traffic congestion, allowing for more parking area downtown, more room for auction grounds and ease of moving trucks around at the new site.

Geography and climate

Geography
Purmerend lies on a swampy and watery area known as Waterland. When the first settlers began cultivating the land, consisting mostly of turf (veen), they dug ditches that run parallel to each other to drain excess water. As a side effect of this process the land began to sink. This resulted in a never-ending battle against the water, and made agriculture near impossible at the time. It also meant that any structure needed to be built on an artificial Terp or natural hill. The former being true for Purmerend which was built on the bank of the river De Where, that linked the former Beemster and Purmer lakes.

Topography

Districts
Purmerend is made up of the following districts.

The municipality of Purmerend also contains the towns/hamlets of Purmerbuurt and partially the Purmer. (The Purmer is shared with Edam-Volendam and Waterland)

Climate

Public transport
Public transportation is mainly focused on Amsterdam, with several bus services and a train service via Zaandam.

There are 3 train stations in Purmerend, in the north, centre and south.
These are:
Purmerend Overwhere (North)
Purmerend (Centre)
Purmerend Weidevenne (South)

The bus station in Purmerend is called "Tramplein" (or, Tram Square), but not because any trams run in Purmerend today. Historically, a tram ("'t Boemeltje") ran from Amsterdam Centraal to Purmerend, ending at the Tramplein location. Although the tram service discontinued years ago, the end stop retained the name Tramplein.

In 1951 The Ramblers had a hit commemorating the tram service "’t Boemeltje van Purmerend".

In 2019, the province of North Holland revealed plans to extend the Amsterdam Metro's Noord-Zuidlijn from Noord station to Purmerend.

Local government

The municipal council of Purmerend consists of 37 seats, which are divided as follows since the elections of November 2021:

The mayor of Purmerend is Don Bijl.

Born in Purmerend
Notable people born in Purmerend:

 Jan Stuyt (1868-1934) a Dutch architect
 Pieter Oud (1886–1968) a Dutch politician, Minister of finance and Mayor of Rotterdam
 Jacobus Oud (1890–1963) a Dutch architect, follower of the De Stijl movement
 Mart Stam (1899-1986) architect, urban planner and chair designer
 Hendrik de Wit (1909–1999) a Dutch systematic botanist
 Leen Verbeek (born 1954) a Dutch politician, Mayor of Purmerend from 2003 to 2008
 Jan van Zanen (born 1961) a Dutch politician, Mayor of Utrecht since 2014
 Hans Klok (born 1969) a Dutch magician, illusionist and actor 
 Duncan Stutterheim (born 1971) a Dutch entrepreneur, founded of the event company ID&T 
 Kim van Kooten (born 1974) a Dutch actress and screenwriter 
 Fleur Agema (born 1976) a Dutch politician and former spatial designer

Sport 

 Martin Koeman (1938–2013) a Dutch footballer, a defender, with over 550 club caps
 Edwin Zoetebier (born 1970) a former football goalkeeper with 358 club caps
 Olaf Lindenbergh (born 1974) a former Dutch footballer with over 450 club caps
 Vincent van der Voort (born 1975) a Dutch professional darts player
 Yuri Rose (born 1979) a Dutch former midfielder with over 400 club caps, currently a manager
 Kees Kwakman (born 1983) a Dutch former professional footballer with over 400 club caps
 Mitchell Dijks (born 1993) football player, about 150 club caps
 Jay Gorter (born 2000), a Dutch goalkeeper for Ajax born in Purmerend.

International relations

Twin towns — sister cities
Until 2017, Purmerend was twinned with:

Gallery

References

Notes

External links

Official website

 
Populated places in North Holland
Municipalities of North Holland
Cities in the Netherlands